Valea Făgetului River may refer to the following rivers in Romania:

 Valea Făgetului, tributary of the Misir in Bihor County
 Valea Făgetului, tributary of the Strei in Hunedoara County

Other 
 Valea Făgețelului River

See also 
Făget River (disambiguation)
Făgețel River (disambiguation)
Fagu River (disambiguation)
Fagu Roșu River (disambiguation)